= Mocasura =

Town of ancient Thrace

Coordinates: 41°02′20″N 27°39′56″E

Mocasura was a town of ancient Thrace, inhabited during Byzantine times.

Its site is tentatively located near Karaevli in European Turkey.
